

235001–235100 

|-id=027
| 235027 Pommard ||  || Pommard, a village in eastern France || 
|}

235101–235200 

|-bgcolor=#f2f2f2
| colspan=4 align=center | 
|}

235201–235300 

|-
| 235201 Lorántffy ||  || Zsuzsanna Lorántffy (1602–1660), a Hungarian aristocrat and wife of Transylvanian prince George Rákóczi I || 
|-id=281
| 235281 Jackwilliamson ||  || Jack Williamson (1908–2006), an American writer || 
|}

235301–235400 

|-bgcolor=#f2f2f2
| colspan=4 align=center | 
|}

235401–235500 

|-bgcolor=#f2f2f2
| colspan=4 align=center | 
|}

235501–235600 

|-bgcolor=#f2f2f2
| colspan=4 align=center | 
|}

235601–235700 

|-id=621
| 235621 Kratochvíle ||  || Kratochvíle, a South Bohemian Renaissance chateau built by B. Maggi in 1583–1589. || 
|}

235701–235800 

|-bgcolor=#f2f2f2
| colspan=4 align=center | 
|}

235801–235900 

|-bgcolor=#f2f2f2
| colspan=4 align=center | 
|}

235901–236000 

|-id=990
| 235990 Laennec ||  || René Laennec (1781–1826), a French physician || 
|-id=999
| 235999 Bucciantini ||  || Niccolò Bucciantini (born 1976), an astronomer at the Arcetri Observatory in Florence, Italy || 
|}

References 

235001-236000